is a Japanese footballer who last played for J1 League club Avispa Fukuoka.

Career
Following five seasons and over 100 appearances for Avispa Fukuoka from 2018, he was released in December 2022.

Club statistics
.

References

External links
Profile at Avispa Fukuoka

Profile at Kashiwa Reysol

1989 births
Living people
Association football people from Ibaraki Prefecture
Japanese footballers
J1 League players
J2 League players
Ventforet Kofu players
Tokushima Vortis players
Mito HollyHock players
Kashiwa Reysol players
Avispa Fukuoka players
Association football midfielders